In 3D computer graphics, a lathed object is a 3D model whose vertex geometry is produced by rotating the points of a spline or other point set around a fixed axis. The lathing may be partial; the amount of rotation is not necessarily a full 360 degrees. The point set providing the initial source data can be thought of as a cross section through the object along a plane containing its axis of radial symmetry.

The lathe is so named because it produces the same type of object that a real lathe would produce: an object that is symmetrical about an axis of rotation.

Lathes are very similar to surfaces of revolution. However, lathes are constructed by rotating a curve defined by a set of points instead of a function. Note that this means that lathes can be constructed by rotating closed curves or curves that double back on themselves (such as the aforementioned torus), whereas a surface of revolution could not because such curves cannot be described by functions.

See also
Surface of revolution
Solid of revolution
Loft (3D)

Computer-aided design